Karpivka is a village in Kramatorsk Raion (district) in Donetsk Oblast of eastern Ukraine, at about  north by west from the centre of Donetsk city. It belongs to Lyman Urban Hromada, one of the hromadas of Ukraine.

The settlement came under attack by Russian forces during the Russian invasion of Ukraine in 2022.

References

Villages in Kramatorsk Raion